Australian vehicle registration plates or number plates are issued by state, territory, and Commonwealth governments, and the armed forces of Australia. The plates are associated with a vehicle and are generally intended to last for the time the vehicle remains registered in the state, though as they become unreadable (or for other reasons) they may be remade with like for like replacement. Motor vehicle registration in Australia, can be renewed monthly, quarterly, half yearly or annually depending on the state or territory where the vehicle is registered.

Current standard issue plates

Standard issue

Other issue

Trailers

Motorcycles 

On all motorcycle plates, the legend is embossed at the top and state/territory.

History and Federal numbering scheme

Standards and federal allocations for all vehicles

From 1910 onwards, vehicle registration plates for each state started at number 1 and were manufactured in enamel.

Starting in 1936, it was decided that Australian plates were to be uniform in size and embossed using standard Australian dies, beginning with New South Wales, the Federal Capital Territory (now ACT) and Victoria. By 1956, the other states and territories had moved to standard Australian embossing using painted or enamelled metal, with dimensions of  × .

In the early 1950s, a uniform scheme for vehicle registration plates was developed, which was to apply across all states and territories. Previously, both New South Wales and Victoria had issued plates with two letters and three digits, in white on a black background. However, that was not entirely popular, and some states and territories preferred to have their own identity reflected on their registration plates.

The following scheme was meant to be implemented Australia-wide after 1952:

Western Australia deemed itself too large to fit into the proposed scheme and devised its own. Plates in the Iaa-nnn series were to be skipped, because as a capital I was believed to be easily mistaken for the number 1. That allowed the two populous states, with a greater number of registered vehicles, to be allocated a series of six letters series: New South Wales had A to F, Victoria had G to H, and J to M. Three other states had a series of three letters: Queensland N, P and Q, South Australia R to T, Western Australia U to V. Due to its small size, Tasmania was only given one letter, W, the Australian Capital Territory was given Y and the Northern Territory was given the letter X. The letter Z was for Commonwealth government departmental use Australia-wide, the second letter reflecting the department. The letters I and O were deemed to be too similar to 1 and 0 and weren't part of the original scheme.

The system, introduced in 1951–52, was not as popular as expected. The Northern Territory declined to participate and continued its previous all-number system. Western Australia did adopt the scheme, taking  XAA-000 to XZZ-999, previously allocated to the NT. WAG-000 to WAG-999 was reserved for WA Government vehicles, later extended to XZZ-999. However, many WA rural shires chose to issue their own plates, in the WA colour scheme, with the initial letters being the shire abbreviations, followed by digits.

All the other states and territories stuck to their initial allocations, until the number of registrations became too large for each state's allocation, so state authorities allowed their registration numbers to "overflow" into series allocated to another state. In 1972, NSW extended its numbering from FZZ-999 to GAA-000, which had been originally issued to Victoria. In 1974, Victoria, having reserved the Maa-nnn series for state government vehicle registrations, extended its numbering from LZZ-999 to IAA-000, with the letter I no longer being avoided. In 1977,it began using IZZ-999 to AAA-000, the latter originally allocated to NSW. South Australia did similar, extending from SZZ-999 to UAA-000, having reserved the Taa-nnn series for trailer registrations.

All states and territories have now adopted their own series, given that the grouped allocations from the 1950s have long since run out. Various combinations of letters and numbers are now used in each state.

Federal Interstate Registration Scheme

Run years: 1 January 1987 to 1 July 2018.

Heavy vehicles (over 4.5 tonnes GVM) can choose to participate in FIRS scheme.

FIRS plates are WX·00AA, and are green on a reflective yellow background.

FIRS plates are issued by state authorities on behalf of the Commonwealth, and carry the format as specified by the Interstate Road Transport Regulations 1986 – Reg 21. Federal Interstate-registered vehicles are prohibited from undertaking intrastate journeys and can only be used for cross-border work.

The first character represents the state of issue:
 A for Australian Capital Territory
 C for Northern Territory
 N for New South Wales
 Q for Queensland
 S for South Australia
 T for Tasmania
 V for Victoria
 W for Western Australia

The second character represents the type of vehicle being registered:
 V for vehicle (typically issued to prime-movers, but are also attached to rigid vehicles such as coaches and moving trucks).
 T for trailer.
 X for extra weight, for vehicles with particular high gross vehicle or aggregate trailer masses.

The remaining characters are allocated by the issuing authorities. As most interstate transport companies are based on the East Coast, the majority of FIRS plates are registered in NSW and VIC. Some issues originate in QLD or SA, with the remaining states appearing relatively rarely.

A typical plate which might be found on a semi-trailer, registered to a company in QLD would be QT·88MW.

 ALL FIRS scheme plates ceased accepting renewals on 1 July 2018 and FIRS closed on 1 July 2019, after all FIRS registration expired and plates exchanged to the new National Heavy Vehicle scheme/state based registration plates.

More details are found under the Infrastructure website of the Federal Government's

National Heavy Vehicle Registration Scheme

Starting 1 July 2018, a new system was implemented in New South Wales, Queensland, South Australia, Australian Capital Territory and Tasmania. Victoria joined the scheme on 1 October 2018.

Northern Territory started using National Heavy Vehicle Plates and abolished the rego stickers effective 1 August 2019.

Western Australia is not participating, hence WA Heavy Vehicles are on state based plates.

The format now in use are:

FB-12AA in Black on white reflection base, and blue band legend with the words NATIONAL HEAVY VEHICLE imprinted on it.

XQ-12AA is for Trucks while YQ-12AA is for Trailers. In this example the prefix denotes X for Trucks and Y for Trailers and the last prefix letter is for home states/territory:
 A for Australian Capital Territory
 N Completed for New South Wales
 O for New South Wales
 Q Completed for Queensland
 B for Queensland
 R for Northern Territory
 S for South Australia
 T for Tasmania
 V Completed for Victoria
 W for Victoria

It replaced the state based general series, however not mandatory and owners can request state based personalised plates if they wish to have them. It applies to new heavy vehicles or heavy vehicle requiring replacement of state based general series plates. 4.5 GVM minimum must qualify for the new plates.

Debate about registration on bicycle riders
For many years in Australia they have had a debate about should registration be also on bicycle riders.

In 2014, Randwick councillor Charles Matthews proposed to impose a $50 registration fee on bicycle riders, which would be used to help fund cycleways being built by the council. This proposal was rejected by other councillors. In 2014 the Victorian council of City of Bayside tried a same proposal.

Common features 

Plates tend to bear the State or Territory name and perhaps a state motto or slogan at the top and/or bottom of the plate. Recent issues of plates (since the 1980s) also often use the state's colours and may include some imagery related to the state (such as the state's logo as the sequence separator).

Alternative fuel vehicle identification 

Under Part 10 of the Australian Light Vehicle Standards Rules 2015, vehicles powered by fuels other than petrol or diesel (collectively alternative fuel systems) must always display a specific plate that is affixed to both the front and rear number plates. These labels exist to assist emergency services personnel in responding to potential hazards involving such vehicles. Generally, such labels are applied permanently to the registration plate by way of pop rivets or other mechanical fixtures.

The standards were updated in March 2019, to add standards for hydrogen and electric powered vehicles.

LPG, LNG or CNG vehicles with more than one tank of that type are required to have one additional diamond attached to the front and back number plates.

Labelling for pre 1 January 2019 hydrogen or electric vehicles 

Hydrogen or electric powered vehicles built or converted before 1 January 2019 are still subject to relevant state-based standards for their labelling. For example in Victoria, all electric-powered vehicles (including hybrid vehicles) need to display "EV" number plate labels on both number plates. Electric-powered passenger cars and hybrid vehicles registered before 4 October 2020 were required to display a different style of label.

Commonwealth and military 

Military plates were nnn-nnn with the first digit corresponding to the military district number:
 1 – Queensland
 2 – New South Wales
 3 – Victoria
 4 – South Australia
 5 – Western Australia
 6 – Tasmania
 7 – Northern Territory

However, new plates issued to the Army are now in this format: nn-nnnn, where the first two digits represent the year the vehicle was registered, e.g. 05-1832.

Current Australian Army registration plate format is Annnnn with this newer format beginning in 2003. The A represents "Army" with the next two digits representing the year the vehicle was first registered. For instance, a 2008 model Toyota Coaster used to transport army cadets might have the plate A08227. This format has also been adopted by the Defence Force, Navy, and Air Force with combinations Dnnnnn, Nnnnnn and Rnnnnn respectively.

The official car of Chief of the Defence Force carries plates ADF1 and official cars for the three service chiefs carry plates ARMY1, NAVY1 or RAAF1.

The Commonwealth Government of Australia used the Z prefix for its government owned vehicles up until 2000 when the Commonwealth Vehicle Registry was closed.

These plates were on a black on white background, usually marked with "C of A" at the top of the plate – an abbreviation of Commonwealth of Australia and the leading Z being red to further distinguish it from other state plates.

Issuance of Z prefixed plates used for same purposes was passed onto the states after 2000. Australian Capital Territory plates started at ZYA-000, Victoria plates started at ZED-000, Queensland plates started at ZQ-0000, New South Wales plates started at ZZZ-000, South Australia plates started at ZSA-000, Western Australia plates started at ZAA-00F and Tasmania plates started at ZTA-000. Only New South Wales and Victoria chose to use their state base colours rather than the standard black on reflective white, with the use of red embossed Z prefix.

Each of the states display their state initials as seen above the numbers instead of the old "C of A" legend.

The Northern Territory still uses the older format and same "C of A" legend at top of the plate.

The registration plate of the Prime Ministerial Limousine was C*1 (i.e. Commonwealth No. 1) with a seven-pointed Commonwealth Star. This was updated on 11 November 2015 showing C (Australian Government crest image) 1. Other Commonwealth fleet cars for official transport carry "C of A" plates in the form C-nnn.

The Governor-General's official cars do not carry registration plates, but simply depict a representation of the St Edward's Crown. They tend to also have a flag mounted on the official car. Similar plates were used for vehicles carrying Queen Elizabeth II when visiting Australia.

Cars owned by the government have special number plates, some also have a crown and symbols.

For official visits to Australia, special plates are often put over the top of normal "Z" plates, depicting the Australian Coat of Arms and, in red "Visit to Australia" with a numeral. These are not strictly registration plates, but are useful for police and other officials to identify cars in official motorcades.

Diplomatic 

Diplomatic plates are issued to foreign diplomats by the Government of the Australian Capital Territory. They would formerly grant diplomatic immunity to the vehicle and driver from all traffic laws, speed limits, parking infringements and tolls in all reasonable course of duty by a diplomatic officer, in compliance with international treaty, but this is no longer the case. They follow the format of "DC nnnn", "DCnnnnn", "DX nnnn" or "DXnnnnn", where the first two or three numbers are the code for the home country of the diplomat, and have black text on a powder blue background. DC plates are issued to members of the diplomatic corps, whereas DX plates are issued to persons who are attached to diplomatic missions but are not themselves diplomats, e.g. household staff.

Older issues have no territory identifier, however newer plates have "ACT" embossed at the top centre of the plate. Newer plates are also written as "DC" and "DX", rather than "D.C." and "D.X." to allow for the inclusion of a greater number of characters in the sequence. A substantial number of older-style plates are still in use, however.

The first two or three numbers appearing in the plate correspond to a specific country, for example 69 is issued to the United Kingdom. The following two digits are typically issued with lower numbers to higher-ranking officials, usually 01 being issued to the ambassador from that country. So DC 6901 would be found on the vehicle of the British High Commissioner to Australia.

The number issued to each country has no particular relevance, and was allocated by ballot. Countries with many vehicles (such as the USA) are allocated two numbers. Before the blue D.C. plates were introduced, diplomatic cars in Canberra carried plates which had white letters on red.

The numbers then correlated to the length of time the particular diplomatic mission had been in Canberra and the British High Commissioner's car carried the plate D.C.1 The replacement arrangement is more egalitarian.

State registration authorities issue CC plates to consular representatives in their relevant state capital.

The ACT Government issues similar plates to representatives of international organisations in the Territory. These plates are also coloured black on powder blue, and follow a format of IO nnnn.

Registration labels abolition 
All states have abolished registration labels for light and heavy vehicles:
 Western Australia – 1 January 2010 beginning with light vehicles and Northern Territory is the last to be abolished from 1 August 2019 for Heavy Vehicles.

See also 
Vehicle registration plates of the Australian Capital Territory
Vehicle registration plates of New South Wales
Vehicle registration plates of the Northern Territory
Vehicle registration plates of Queensland
Vehicle registration plates of South Australia
Vehicle registration plates of Tasmania
Vehicle registration plates of Victoria
Vehicle registration plates of Western Australia
Vehicle registration plates of Christmas Island
Vehicle registration plates of Norfolk Island

Notes

References 
 Blue Mountains Family History Society (2007) Australian number plates Springwood, NSW: Blue Mountains Family History Society. 
 Nance, Tony (1980) Australian number plates Beaumaris, Vic. 
 Wright, D.C. (1983) Australasian (motor vehicle) registration plates, 1901–1982 Montmorency, Vic.

External links 
Custom plates issuing authorities:
 NSW: MyPlates
 Victoria: Vplates
 South Australia: EzyPlates
 Queensland: Personalised Plates
 Tasmania: TasPlates
 Western Australia: Dept of Transport WA
 Australian Capital Territory: Access Canberra
 Northern Territory: NT Gov MVR

 
Australia transport-related lists
Registration plates
Australia
 Registration plates